"Love Broke Thru" is a song by Christian hip hop-rock-pop musician TobyMac from his seventh studio album, This Is Not a Test. The song reached No. 1 on Christian Airplay.

Background

According to TobyMac, the song was written about how God broke through in his life and how he feels the same should happen with a divided nation. The video for the song was released on Billboard in January 2017. It depicts a young man trying to cope with anger while his grandfather calls for peace among protests over police violence around the country.

Charts

Weekly charts

Year-end charts

Certifications

References

TobyMac songs
ForeFront Records singles
2016 singles
2015 songs
Songs written by Bart Millard
Songs written by TobyMac
Songs written by Christopher Stevens (musician)